The 1992 Volvo PGA Championship was the 38th edition of the Volvo PGA Championship, an annual professional golf tournament on the European Tour. It was held 22–25 May at the West Course of Wentworth Club in Virginia Water, Surrey, England, a suburb southwest of London.

Tony Johnstone shot a final-round 65 to win his first Volvo PGA Championship by two shots ahead of Gordon Brand Jnr and José María Olazábal.

Round summaries

First round 
Thursday, 22 May 1992

Second round 
Friday, 23 May 1992

Third round 
Saturday, 24 May 1992

Final round 
Sunday, 25 May 1992

References 

BMW PGA Championship
Golf tournaments in England
Volvo PGA Championship
Volvo PGA Championship
Volvo PGA Championship